Silvia Spross (born in Dielsdorf, Zurich) is a Swiss-born American film, television, and stage actress. Originally from Gais Appenzell.

Biography
Silvia Spross began her career as a street performer in Central Park, doing shows with a tap dancing puppet named Bonifaz. She attended Uta Hagen's HB Studio in Manhattan full-time for three years. Since then, Miss Spross has appeared in numerous independent films, working with actors such as Adrien Brody, Danny Glover, Martin Landau, Michael Rooker, Christopher Masterson and the renowned Italian director Dario Argento. Miss Spross has also been featured in a number of theatrical productions, including the Off-Broadway show "St Nicholas At Christmas Tide."

Miss Spross currently lives in Los Angeles where she works with her mentor Robert Miano.
Swiss German.

Filmography

References

External links
Official site

Swiss film actresses
Swiss television actresses
Swiss stage actresses
Swiss people of German descent
Living people
People from Dielsdorf District
Swiss bloggers
Swiss women bloggers
21st-century Swiss women writers
Year of birth missing (living people)